Tallahatchie may refer to:
Tallahatchie County, Mississippi
Tallahatchie River
USS Tallahatchie (1863)
USS Tallahatchie County (LST-1154)